Indrit Sejko (born 1 September 2005) is an Albanian professional footballer who plays as a forward for Butrinti.

sq:Indrit Sejko

Career statistics

Club

Notes

References

2005 births
Living people
People from Sarandë
Albanian footballers
Association football forwards
Kategoria e Parë players